Eupithecia profuga is a moth in the family Geometridae. It is found in Somalia.

References

Moths described in 1931
profuga
Moths of Africa